Magnus Nygren (born June 7, 1990) is a Swedish professional ice hockey defenceman who currently plays for and is an alternate captain of HC Davos of the National League (NL). Nygren was the 113th overall pick by the Montreal Canadiens in the 2011 NHL Entry Draft.

Playing career
On May 21, 2013, he was signed to a two-year entry level contract with the Montreal Canadiens. During his first season in North America in 2013–14, Nygren was assigned to American Hockey League affiliate, the Hamilton Bulldogs. However after 16 games Nygren opted to return home to play on loan with Färjestad BK on November 27, 2013.

Nygren returned to the Bulldogs for the final year of his contract with the Canadiens, however was limited to 15 games due to injury. At season's end, Nygren unsurprisingly returned to Färjestad BK on a one-year contract for the 2015–16 season on May 8, 2015.

On April 12, 2017, Nygren agreed to a one-year contract with HC Davos of the National League (NL). On November 3, 2017, Nygren was signed to an early one-year contract extension by HC Davos. On December 28, 2018, Nygren agreed to an early two-year contract extension to remain with HC Davos through the 2020-21 season. On March 23, 2021, Nygren agreed to an early three-year contract extension with HC Davos through the 2023/24 season.

Career statistics

Regular season and playoffs

International

References

External links

1990 births
Living people
Bofors IK players
HC Davos players
Färjestad BK players
Hamilton Bulldogs (AHL) players
Montreal Canadiens draft picks
Mora IK players
Sportspeople from Karlstad
Swedish expatriate ice hockey players in Canada
Swedish ice hockey defencemen